Luis Ernesto Ramos Yordán (February 5, 1915 – January 27, 2005) was a Puerto Rican physician, legislator, and President of the House of Representatives of Puerto Rico from 1973 to 1977.

Early years
Ramos Yordán was born in Ponce, Puerto Rico on February 2, 1915. He received his degree from the Syracuse University in Syracuse, New York, and his Doctor of Medicine degree from the Universidad Nacional Autónoma de México.  He subsequently did advanced post-graduate work at Columbia University.

Political life
In the 1968 general elections Ramos Yordan was elected to the Puerto Rico House of Representatives as a representative at-large. He is a member of the Popular Democratic Party of Puerto Rico. During his term, he was minority leader in the House. In 1972 he was re-elected and became the speaker of that legislative body.

See also

 List of Puerto Ricans

References

|-

1915 births
2005 deaths
National Autonomous University of Mexico alumni
Speakers of the House of Representatives of Puerto Rico
Popular Democratic Party members of the House of Representatives of Puerto Rico
Physicians from Ponce
Politicians from Ponce
Syracuse University alumni